Angkasapuri is the main governmental building for Malaysia's Ministry of Information and it is also the headquarters for Radio Television Malaysia (RTM) located in Lembah Pantai, Kuala Lumpur, Malaysia.

History

Pre-Angkasapuri (1946–1968)

Radio
RTM was established as Radio Malaya operating out of Singapore on 1 April 1946. Upon Malayan independence in 1957, RTM was split into two stations, with Radio Singapura taking over in Singapore while Radio Malaya moved to Federal House, Victory Avenue, Kuala Lumpur, going on air from the new location on 1 January 1959. Radio Malaya became Radio Malaysia on 16 September 1963 upon the formation of Malaysia.

Before moving into the Federal House, Radio Malaya's Kuala Lumpur activities included the setup of main office in Oriental Building at Java Street (now Jalan Tun Perak) and a temporary recording studio in Tang Ling Hospital at Young Road (now Pesiaran Raja Chulan).

Television
Television broadcasts were launched on 28 December 1963, at Dewan Tunku Abdul Rahman (now the Malaysian Tourist Information Centre or MATIC), along Jalan Ampang, Kuala Lumpur.

Angkasapuri (1968–present)
Malaysia's new broadcasting centre, named "Angkasapuri" began construction in 1966 and was complete by February 1968. Angkasapuri was officially opened by the first Prime Minister of Malaysia, Tunku Abdul Rahman Putra Al-Haj Ibni Almarhum Sultan Abdul Hamid Halim Shah on 17 January 1968. Wisma Televisyen, or Wisma TV, housing RTM's TV division opened on 6 November 1969.

Radio Malaysia became Rangkaian Nasional on 1 January 1971 and became the nation's first 24-hour radio station. Wisma Radio was added on 9 May 1972. RTM began colour TV transmissions for the States of Malaya in December 1978, in conjunction with the state broadcaster's fifteenth anniversary. The first colour programme broadcast was Puspawarna. Colour TV programmes were extended to Sabah and Sarawak in 1980.

Angkasapuri created history when a giant national flag measuring 85.3 meters long and 24.3-meters wide, using 60 rolls of fabric was unfurled by 500 employees of the Ministry of Information. The giant flag was raised for 10 minutes starting at 09:00 local time and it was witnessed by 5000 of the ministry's staff on 1 January 1988.

2012 saw the addition of Wisma Berita RTM, containing RTM's newsroom, to the Angkasapuri complex. It was inaugurated by the then-Malaysian Minister of Information, Communication, Arts and Culture, Dato' Seri Utama Dr. Rais Yatim on 6 June 2012.

Angkasapuri Media City 
On 26 October 2022, the ninth Prime Minister of Malaysia, Datuk Seri Ismail Sabri Yaakob launched a new media city building in the complex named the Angkasapuri Media City.

Features
Angkasapuri Broadcasting Centre is located in the jurisdictional area of Kuala Lumpur City Hall. The building was erected with a height of 10-floors above an area of about 33 acres, at the junction of Kuala Lumpur - Port Klang Federal Highway and New Pantai Expressway (NPE). The main entrance of the complex faces the NPE.

It has the following structures:
Main Building – administration building for the Broadcasting Department.
Wisma Televisyen – houses RTM's TV division.
Wisma Radio – RTM's radio division.
International Broadcast Centre (IBC) – Opened on 24 August 1998, RTM's engineering department and other departments are located here, in addition to international shortwave radio broadcasts. It served as the International Broadcast Centre of the 1998 Commonwealth Games, with RTM being the event's host broadcaster.
Wisma Berita RTM is home to RTM's newsroom. 
Auditorium Perdana – home to major live broadcasts.
Auditorium P. Ramlee – named after the late artist, P. Ramlee (1929 - 1973).
Tun Abdul Razak Institute for Broadcasting and Information (IPPTAR) – Selangor state radio station, Selangor FM and headquarters of Asia-Pacific Broadcasting Union, which RTM is one of its members are located here.

Transportation

Car
 Federal Route 2 Federal Highway - Kuala Lumpur to Port Klang.
 New Pantai Expressway - Angkasapuri is located near the beginning of this expressway, which goes all the way to Subang Jaya.

Public transportation
 Angkasapuri lends its name to the  Angkasapuri KTM station, located just across the NPE from the complex's main gate. It is linked by a pedestrian bridge.

See also
 List of concert hall in Malaysia

References

External links

 https://web.archive.org/web/20070926225852/http://hids.arkib.gov.my/doc/jilidi/februari/17_02_1968_1980.htm
 Bendera Kita Menjadi Sejarah, Unit 2, Muka 28 hingga 30, Bahasa Malaysia Tingkatan 3 KBSM, Dewan Bahasa dan Pustaka, 1989.

Buildings and structures in Kuala Lumpur
Mass media in Malaysia
Buildings and structures completed in 1968
20th-century architecture in Malaysia